São Nicolau Regional Football Association (Portuguese: Associação Regional de Futebol de São Nicolau, abbreviation: ARFSN,) is a football (soccer) association covering the island of São Nicolau .  It is headquartered in the island capital of Ribeira Brava  The association are one of six in Cape Verde that covers only one municipality.  It is the sublevel of the Capeverdean Football Federation.

The championship only has a single division where seven clubs participate, a club with the most points promotes into the National Championships.

History
The association was founded in 1982, a few years after independence. Formerly consisted of four clubs, it later raised to five, six in 2003 and seven since 2004. Since 2015, the association are the remaining four associations which contains only a single level football competition.

Organization
The association also organizes and functions the regional championships, the Cup, the Super Cup and the Opening Tournament, commonly as the Association Cup (equivalent to the two-tier cup in other countries which includes the League Cup).  The association has eight registered clubs, one is a non-participant Calejão, the regional champion competes in the National Championships each season.

São Nicolau Island Championships

Registered clubs
The region's registered clubs as of October 2017 include.

References

External links
São Nicolau Regional Football Association website 

Association football governing bodies in Cape Verde
Sport in São Nicolau, Cape Verde
1982 establishments in Cape Verde